Swinford is a surname. Notable people with the name include: 

David Swinford (1941-2022), American politician
Emerson Swinford, Los Angeles-based guitarist, composer/songwriter and producer.
Mac Swinford (1899–1975), United States federal judge
Thomas Swinford (1839–1915), English cricketer